Salerano sul Lambro is a comune (municipality) in the Province of Lodi in the Italian region Lombardy, located about  southeast of Milan and about  southwest of Lodi.

Salerano sul Lambro borders the following municipalities: San Zenone al Lambro, Lodi Vecchio, Casaletto Lodigiano, Borgo San Giovanni, Caselle Lurani, Castiraga Vidardo.

References

External links
 Official website

Cities and towns in Lombardy